Young God is the second EP by American experimental rock band Swans. It was released in 1984, through record label K.422. It is also referred to as "Raping a Slave" and "I Crawled", but is officially referred to as Young God by the band. As with Cop, the cover art includes a notice that the record is "designed to be played at maximum volume."

Background 

Young God is considered by critics to be one of Swans' most brutal releases, similar in sound to the band's first two albums, Filth (1983) and  Cop (1984), but slightly more experimental, and with subject matter exemplified by the title track, from the point of view of serial killer Ed Gein. One notable element of the release is the use of a chain and metal table in the percussion section, thus causing critics to tag the album in the industrial and experimental music categories. The EP was recorded during the last of the recording sessions of Cop.

Release and legacy 

The EP sold around 1,000 copies in its first year, making it K.422's highest-selling record. In 1992, the entire recording was released as bonus tracks to the compact disc edition of the Cop LP, and the entirety of that edition would be released as the first disc to the double disc compilation Cop/Young God/Greed/Holy Money. Kurt Cobain included it (under the name of "Raping a Slave") as his fiftieth favorite album on one of his last "50 Favorite Albums" lists in his Journals. The Swiss band The Young Gods took their name from this EP.

Justin Broadrick of Godflesh cited Young God as a key inspiration for his music. About the EP, he said:

Track listing

Personnel 
 Michael Gira – vocals, tapes, production, sleeve design
 Harry Crosby – bass guitar
 Roli Mosimann – drums, tapes, production
 Norman Westberg – guitar
 H. Lombardi – engineering
 Voco – engineering
 Repul. H. L. – sleeve artwork
 J. Erskine – technical assistance

Charts

References

External links 

 

1984 EPs
Swans (band) EPs
No wave EPs